Chicago Corners is an unincorporated community in Outagamie County, Wisconsin, United States. It is located in the Town of Oneida and in the Oneida Nation of Wisconsin.

Geography
Chicago Corners is located at  (44.474517, -88.450125). Its elevation is at 758 feet (231m).

References

External links
Hometown Locator: Chicago Corners

Unincorporated communities in Outagamie County, Wisconsin
Unincorporated communities in Wisconsin